Xie Hongjun (born 2 August 1929) is a former Chinese footballer.

Club career
As an 11-year-old, Xie Hongjun played for Shanghai Jiangnan Shipyard's football team. Throughout his career, Hongjun played for Shanghai Team, East Team, the Navy football team and Bayi. Xie was regarded as China's fastest football player, running 100 metres in 11.2 seconds.

International career
Xie made his debut for  China in 1953. In 1954, Xie travelled with the Chinese national team on a year-and-a-half long tour of Hungary and eastern Europe. In 1956, Xie was selected to play for China at the 1956 Summer Olympics, however China withdrew.

Coaching career
In 1975, Xie became a youth team coach for Beijing. Xie began to coach his son, Xie Feng, when he was three years-old.

Personal life
Xie Hongjun is married to former Chinese sprinter Zheng Yuru. Together they have a son, Xie Feng, who played for Beijing Guoan and Shenzhen Pingan.

References

1929 births
Living people
Chinese footballers
Footballers from Zhongshan
Bayi Football Team players
China international footballers
People from Zhongshan

Association footballers not categorized by position